The 1920 Yale Bulldogs football team represented Yale University in the 1920 college football season. The Bulldogs finished with a 5–3 record under third-year head coach Tad Jones.  Yale guard Tim Callahan was a consensus selection for the 1920 College Football All-America Team, receiving first team honors from Walter Camp, the United Press, and the International News Service.  Yale's other guard, John Acosta, also received first-team All-America honors from Walter Eckersall.

Schedule

References

Yale
Yale Bulldogs football seasons
Yale Bulldogs football